Lemsine, the pen name of Aïcha Laidi (born 1942), is an Algerian writer writing in French.

She was born near Tébessa. She is an advocate for women's rights. She has been vice-president of the Women's World Organization for Rights, Literature, and Development and served on the PEN club's International Women's Committee. She was forced to leave Algeria because she was considered a dangerous person by Islamic militants.

Biography 
Aïcha is the author of novels and essays, she has also written for the Algerian press and abroad. She is an international speaker, specialized in the history of Islam, political Islamism and the rights of Muslim women.  she was regularly invited to participate in seminars and congresses around the world. Her husband, Ali Laïdi, was the Algerian ambassador to Spain (1965–1970)), Jordan (1977–1984), in Great Britain and Ireland (1984–1988) and in Mexico (1988–1991).

Lemsine's first two novels are based on events around the time of the Algerian War of Independence. Her work has been translated into Spanish, Portuguese, Arabic and English.

In 1995, she was awarded a Hellman-Hammett Grant by Human Rights Watch to support her work.

Lemsine married the diplomat Ali Laidi.

The name Lemsine is constructed from the Arabic letters (ل pronounced "lām") (L) and (س pronounced "sīn") (S), which are the first letters of her married and birth surnames.

Roman La Chrysalide 
In the novel La Chrysalide, Aïcha Lemsine describes the evolution of Algerian society and women, through the life of several generations of an Algerian family. This book, published in French, was then the first novel of an Algerian woman, fourteen years after the national independence of Algeria,to expose the contradiction between the reality of the condition of women in her country and the Constitution proclaiming an "egalitarian socialism" where "Fundamental freedoms and human and citizen rights are guaranteed. Any discrimination based on prejudices of sex, race or profession is prohibited (Art.39).

The book was banned. The ministry of "habous and Islamic affairs" sent gendarmes to withdraw "the Chrysalis" of the "Éditions des Femmes" stand participating in the first international exhibition.The official censorship was then coordinated with the critical violence launched by the nomenklatura of a group of university women, calling the book "a pink and neo-colonialist novel", and even "anti-patriotic".

Bibliography 
 Graebner, Seth. Encyclopedia of African Literature. New York and London: Routledge, 2003.

Selected works 
 La chrysalide: Chroniques algeriennes, novel (1976), translated into English as "The Chrysalis"
 Ciel de porphyre, novel (1978), translated into English as "Beneath a Sky of Porphyry"
 Ordalie des voix, essay (1983)
 Au Cœur du Hezbollah, essay (2008) ("In the heart of Hezbollah")

References

External links 
 

1942 births
Living people
Algerian women novelists
Algerian novelists
Pseudonymous women writers
Algerian journalists
Algerian women's rights activists
People from Tébessa
20th-century Algerian writers
20th-century Algerian women writers
21st-century Algerian writers
21st-century Algerian women writers
Algerian women journalists
20th-century pseudonymous writers
21st-century pseudonymous writers